Ahna O'Reilly is an American actress. She is best known for her role in the film The Help (2011).

Career
O'Reilly began her acting career in 2003 in the film, Bill the Intern. She has appeared in several other movies like Dinocroc, Nancy Drew, Just Add Water and Forgetting Sarah Marshall.  She also acted in television series like CSI: NY, Unhitched, The Vampire Diaries and Prime Suspect.

In 2011, she appeared in the movie The Help based on Kathryn Stockett's best-selling novel of the same name, a period piece set in Jackson, Mississippi, in the 1960s. The film opened to positive reviews and became a box-office success with a worldwide gross of $211,608,112. It also won several ensemble awards including National Board of Review Award, Screen Actors Guild Award and Satellite Award. O'Reilly co-starred in the 2013 film Jobs, alongside Ashton Kutcher and Josh Gad, about the life of technology pioneer Steve Jobs.

In 2016, she appeared in the Roundabout Theatre Company off-Broadway production of The Robber Bridegroom. A cast recording featuring O'Reilly in her role as Rosamund was released on September 9, 2016.

In 2017, O’Reilly starred as Sarah Foster in the film Sleepwalker.

Personal life
O'Reilly graduated from Menlo School in 2003 and attended the University of Southern California for one year before dropping out. She dated actor James Franco for a time before the two broke up in 2011. In December 2021 O'Reilly announced via Instagram that she married writer and producer Dave Andron a year earlier, in secret.

Filmography

Film

Television

References

External links

 

American film actresses
Living people
American television actresses
Outstanding Performance by a Cast in a Motion Picture Screen Actors Guild Award winners
21st-century American actresses
Year of birth missing (living people)